Miller's Bridge railway station was a station in Bootle, Lancashire, England. The station was opened prior to 1851 on the southern side of Balliol Road and closed around 1876.

References

Former Lancashire and Yorkshire Railway stations
Railway stations in Great Britain opened in 1851
Railway stations in Great Britain closed in 1876